Flandrau may refer to:

Flandrau, a planet in the List of minor planets: 18001–19000#301
Flandrau State Park, a state park in Minnesota
Charles Flandrau (disambiguation)
Grace Flandrau, an American writer

See also
Flandreau (disambiguation)